Paratorna pteropolia is a species of moth of the family Tortricidae. It is found in China (Sichuan).

The wingspan is about 13–14.6 mm. The forewings are greyish white from the costa to the apex, but the termen and dorsum are brown. There is a brown spot at the middle of the costa and another at the end of the discal cell. The hindwings are greyish white with a brown costa and apex.

References

Moths described in 1988
Tortricini
Moths of Asia